(born 22 February 1992 in Kyoto) is a Japanese rugby union player.

References

Living people
1992 births
Japan international rugby union players
Saitama Wild Knights players
Tasman rugby union players
Sunwolves players
Rugby union scrum-halves
Japanese rugby union players